Trouble Time is a 1992 blues album by Tinsley Ellis. It was recorded by Mark Richardson at Triclops Sound Studios and Ricky Keller at Southern Living Studio in Atlanta, Georgia with horns recorded by Lynn Fuston at Classic Recording Nashville, Tennessee. It was mixed by Rodney Mills assisted by Russ Fowler and Tag George at Southern Tracks Studios Atlanta, Georgia, mastered by Dr. Toby Mountain at Northeastern Digital, Southborough, Massachusetts, and produced by Ricky Keller, Tinsley Ellis and Bruce Iglauer, with Michael Rothschild as executive producer. Tinsley wrote/co-wrote all songs except "Hey Hey Baby", "What Have I Done Wrong?" and "The Axe".

Track listing
 "Highwayman"
 "Hey Hey Baby"
 "Sign of the Blues"
 "What Have I Done Wrong?"
 "The Big Chicken"
 "The Axe"
 "Come Morning"
 "My Restless Heart"
 "Bad Dream # 108"
 "The Hulk"
 "Now I'm Gone"
 "Red Dress"

Musicians
Tinsley Ellis on guitar and vocals
Ricky Keller and James Ferguson on bass guitar  
Chuck Leavell on piano
Peter Buck on guitar
Scott Meeder and David Sims on drums 
Oliver Wells on organ and keyboards 
Mike Boyette on piano and organ

Horns on "Now I'm Gone":
Sam Levine on tenor saxophone
Chris McDonald on trombone
Mike Haynes and Michael Holton on trumpet

References

External links
Tinsley Ellis website

1992 albums
Tinsley Ellis albums